Dev Dham Jodhpuriya is a temple situated in the Tonk district of Rajasthan, India dedicated to the folk diety Devnarayan.

Festivals
There are two fairs organised each year at the temple in memory of Devnarayan. During these, bhopas of Devnarayan make figures related to his birth.
The temple is decorated with various statues. These include statues representing the cousins of Devnarayan, Bhuna and Mehandu, along with their half-sister, Taradey Panwar. Other statues commemorate, Sawai Bhoj, aswell as depicting different events in his life.

Aarati and Night vigils

Aarati (major worship) of Devnarayan takes place three times daily, at 4 am,  11 am and 7 pm. Friday is the day when devotees from distant villages and cities come to visit the temple.

Night vigils (jaagirn) are organised by many devotees, especially on Fridays and almost daily in the summer season.

The following quote can be observed on every image of Devnarayan:

"Samvat 968 ke aansh, janam liya Gurjar ke vansh
Sadhu sati ke vachno dwara,kamal phool Dev liya avatar."

This is translated as saying that he was incarnated in the Gurjar dynasty in 911 AD to fulfill the promise he gave to Saadu Maata Gurjari.

References

External links
www.devdham.org
https://www.rajasthandirect.com/tourism/temples/dev-dham-jodhpuriya

Devnarayan
Folk deities of Rajasthan
Villages in Tonk district
Hindu temples in Rajasthan
Hindu temples in Tonk district